Irina Spîrlea and Caroline Vis were the defending champions, but lost in semifinals to Julie Halard-Decugis and Sandrine Testud.

Julie Halard-Decugis and Sandrine Testud won the title by defeating Åsa Carlsson and Émilie Loit 3–6, 6–3, 6–4 in the final.

Seeds

Draw

Draw

References
 Official results archive (ITF)
 Official results archive (WTA)

Doubles
Open Gaz de France